Venus Flytrap is a Dutch indie rock band formed in 1996. The band has built a modest following and cult status based on TV, radio and live performances. The video for the song "The Gift" became "Clip of the Week" on music station TMF even before its release as a single. One year later, the song "Radical Dream" got much airplay on Dutch public radio station 3FM, which triggered frequent live performances in various music venues in the Netherlands.

After the release of their second album Hoovering (2003), record label My First Sonny Weissmuller organized special evening shows for its bands, which again meant many live performances for Venus Flytrap in 2003 and 2004. In the fall of 2003, the band opened (among other bands) for the Australian The Sleepy Jackson and the American band The Long Winters. In March 2004, Venus Flytrap toured through southern states of the US, playing at the South By South West (SXSW) festival in Austin, Texas, followed by shows in New Orleans, Houston and San Antonio. A second tour took the band to the East Coast of the United States, where they played in Washington, Philadelphia, Baltimore and New York (CBGB, Arlene's Grocery, and Sin é). For the international release of their third album Come with us in 2009 the band toured in Canada, on the invitation of the Canadian Music Week.

Discography

Albums
Come With Us (2007)
Hoovering (2003)
This Is Your Exit Plan (2000)

External links
Description at Muziekcentrum Nederland
Band website

Dutch rock music groups